Niccolò Guicciardini Corsi Salviati (born 28 May 1957 in Firenze) is an Italian historian of mathematics. He is a professor at the University of Milan, and is known for his studies on the works of Isaac Newton.

Guicciardini obtained his Ph.D. in 1987 under the supervision of Ivor Grattan-Guinness.

In 2011 he was awarded the Fernando Gil International Prize for the Philosophy of Science.

Selected publications
 The development of Newtonian calculus in Britain, 1700-1800, Cambridge University Press, 1989 (paperback 2003).
 Reading the Principia: the debate on Newton's mathematical methods for natural philosophy from 1687 to 1736, Cambridge University Press, 1999 (paperback 2003).
 Isaac Newton on mathematical certainty and method, MIT Press, 2009 (paperback 2011).

References

External links
Homepage

Italian historians of mathematics
1957 births
Living people
Academic staff of the University of Bergamo
Newton scholars
University of Milan alumni